The Roland Bolt 30/60/100 was the only line of tube guitar amplifiers produced by Roland. The amplifier was launched in the market in 1979 when the Roland company was trying to pursue the success of the Mesa Boogie Mark amplifiers. 

The amplifier has a MOSFET-based solid state preamp section and an all-tube power amp. The power amp section is an exact clone of the Fender AB763 circuit. The amplifiers have two channels, a clean and an Overdrive, switchable on the front panel or through a foot-switch. Aside from the overdrive circuit, the amp contains a spring reverb and provision for external effects using the effects loop.

The Bolt was produced until 1984: Roland made a decision at that time to focus production on solid state amplifiers such as their very successful Jazz Chorus. In recent years the interest in this range of amplifiers has increased, owing to their good tone, and affordability in comparison with other classic amplifiers.

Both combo (amp/speaker) and 'head' versions of these amplifiers were produced, and three models were released: the Bolt 30 (30 watts), Bolt 60 (60 watts) and the Bolt 100 (100 watts).

References

External links
 Roland Bolt 30/60/100 dedicated webpage

Instrument amplifiers